Lester Andrew Josephson (July 29, 1942 – January 1, 2020) was an American professional football running back in the National Football League for the Los Angeles Rams. He played college football at Augustana College.

Early years
Josephson's football career had its start in his high school days in Minneota, Minnesota, where he played 8-man football. He did not play 11-man ball until he began college at Augustana in Sioux Falls, South Dakota.

His early college years were outstanding, playing on a college team that showed unusual success and talent. The team during his final two years, however, had only mediocre success, and his hope to be claimed in the pro football draft faded.

Professional career

Dallas Cowboys
Josephson was signed by the Dallas Cowboys in 1964 as an undrafted free agent, because they were impressed with his athletic ability. The Cowboys needed an offensive tackle because of injuries and although they did not want to lose Josephson, he was traded during training camp to the Los Angeles Rams in exchange for Jim Boeke.

Los Angeles Rams
He joined the backfield of Roman Gabriel as a rookie fullback, and became a team leader for the next decade.

Josephson was selected for the Pro Bowl in 1967, after having his best professional season with 800 rushing yards. In the Pro Bowl, he scored a first-quarter touchdown in the 38–20 West victory. The next year, he suffered a left calf injury in pre-season, while running through the stadium tunnel to the field. After the cast for the injury was removed, he tore the Achilles tendon of the same leg while jumping rope during his rehabilitation and was placed on the injured reserve list.

Injuries including a broken jaw and the ruptured Achilles tendon slowed him down but he contributed to the team for many years after his worst injuries. He retired in 1975 after he was waived during the preseason. At the time. his 3,407 rushing yards were the third highest rushing total in Rams' history.

Personal life
After his career, he acted in several films and also served as a football film consultant.

Films and television
 Technical consultant for Gus (1976)
 Nickelodeon as a bouncer
 Police Woman episode "Death Game" (1977)
 Superdome (1978TV) as Caretta
 Heaven Can Wait (1978) as Owens. Josephson also served as a technical consultant for the film.

References

1942 births
2020 deaths
Players of American football from Minnesota
American male film actors
American football running backs
Augustana (South Dakota) Vikings football players
Los Angeles Rams players
Western Conference Pro Bowl players
People from Minneota, Minnesota